Zibad Castle is one of the four historical monuments of Zibad, Iran, located in the  Kakhk district of Gonabad County, in the Razavi Khorasan Province. It is believed to be the last refuge of Yazdegerd III, whose death signaled the collapse of the Sasanian Empire and the conquest of pre-Islamic Iran. In 2001, the castle was registered as a national heritage property. Zibad Castle has also been nationally registered under the name of Shahab Castle since 2002.

Last shelter of the last Sasanian emperor 
In 651, Yazdegerd III was defeated by the Muslim Arabs in the city of Gonabad in the province of Merv. His heavy Sasanian cavalry was too sluggish and systematized to contain them; if he had employed lightly-armed Arab or East Iranian mercenaries from Khorasan and Transoxiana he would have been much more successful.
Shortly after this, Yazdegerd III was murdered, leaving several different and contradictory narratives about his death. 

One source reports he sought refuge with a miller, who killed him to obtain his jewelry on the orders of Mahoe Suri.  

The narration of Al-Baladhuri in Kitab Futuh al-Buldan suggests that Yazdgerd was killed in Gonabad. The main text of Blazeri's book The Fate of Yazdgerd III:

The death of Yazdegerd marked the end of the Sasanian Empire, the last Persian imperial dynasty before the arrival of Islam (224-651). All of Khorasan was soon conquered by the Arabs, who would use it as a base to attack Transoxiana.

Sufeh Pir 
Sufeh Pir is a cave believed to be the tomb of Piran Viseh in Kūh-Zibad mountain. He was a Turanian figure in Shahnameh, the national epic of Greater Iran. Beside Shahnameh, Piran is also mentioned in other sources such as Tabari and Tha'ālibī. He was the king of Khotan and the spahbed of Afrasiab, the king of Turan.

According to the book of Dr Abas Zamani Piran Viseh was buried in the cave of Sofe Zibad now called DarSufa Pir.

See also

Zibad
Davazdah Rokh
Kūh-Zibad
Bajestan
Ferdous
Birjand

References

Sources
 

 
 
 
Report of a Persian magazine
Castle of Shah Nesheen Zibad
Dr Ajam, Geography of the 12 Rokh War in Zibad Gonabad, Mashahd University Magazine Simorgh No9 year9. 953942   شابک ۹۵۳۹۴۲
3 historical Places in Zibad. Persian book
Geography of Gonabad
Pangereh Magazine 2012 Castle of Zeibad by Dr Ajam
Photo of the castle
Zibad history by Dr Ajam
shahname/12rokh war
Book by Dr Zamani and Ajam 1972 no 41 magazine
Article in Persian language. Parssea magazine, 2011
Geography and tribe and minority in Khorasan, Mohammad Ajam, research published 1992, University of Imam Sadegh, Tehran.

Gallery 

Populated places in Gonabad County
Tourist attractions in Razavi Khorasan Province
Castles in Iran